The Enchanted Forest is a 1987 Spanish comedy-fantasy film directed by José Luis Cuerda and written by Rafael Azcona, based on the eponymous novel written by Wenceslao Fernández Flórez. The film has a large ensemble cast headed by Alfredo Landa. It was a critical success winning five Goya Awards including Best Film, Best Director and Best Actor.

Plot
The film shows the adventures of the human inhabitants of the shrubland of Cecebre and how their paths cross over under the shelter of a lively forest where animals, people and plants form a harmonious system. It notably tells the misfortunes of Malvís, a farm hand sick of the shortages of his trade, who decides to become a bandit and hides in the shrubland under the alias Fendetestas, and who is joined by a kid as an apprentice, Fuco; of Geraldo, a well-digger who lost a leg while whale hunting and is in love with Hermelinda, who is leaving to the city fed up with her aunt; of the lost soul of Fiz de Cotovelo, damned to follow the procession of spirits; and of the D'Abondo family, the lords and ladies of the parroquia, among other characters.

Cast

Release 
The film was theatrically released on 2 October 1987.

Accolades 

|-
| align = "center" rowspan = "8" | 1988 || rowspan = "8" | 2nd Goya Awards || colspan = "2" | Best Film ||  || rowspan = "8" | 
|-
| Best Screenplay || Rafael Azcona ||  
|-
| Best Actor || Alfredo Landa || 
|-
| Best Original Score || José Nieto || 
|-
| Best Art Direction || Félix Murcia || 
|-
| Best Cinematography || Javier Aguirresarobe || 
|-
| Best Costume Design || Javier Artiñano || 
|-
| Best Sound || Bernardo Menz, Enrique Molinero || 
|}

See also 
 List of Spanish films of 1987

References

External links

1987 films
Best Film Goya Award winners
Films based on Spanish novels
Spanish comedy films
1980s Spanish-language films
Films with screenplays by Rafael Azcona
1980s Spanish films
Films directed by José Luis Cuerda